Reuben Bourne (fl. 1692), was an English dramatist.

Bourne belonged to the Middle Temple, and left behind him a comedy which has never been acted. The title of this is 'The Contented Cuckold, or Woman's Advocate,' 4to, 1692. Its scene is Edmonton, and the principal character, Sir Peter Lovejoy, contends that a cuckold is one of the scarcest of created beings.

References

English dramatists and playwrights
17th-century English writers
17th-century English male writers
Year of birth missing
Year of death missing
English male dramatists and playwrights